Radio in Bosnia and Herzegovina was first officially introduced in 1945 by Radio Sarajevo. Out of total 193 radio stations, 171 of radiostations are broadcasting their radio programmes via FM & AM frequencies. The frequencies planned for the DAB and DAB + band are still not used. Broadcast licenses for all frequencies are assigned by state-level Communications Regulatory Agency of Bosnia and Herzegovina.

Three public network radio services are funded through subscription (BH Radio 1, Federalni Radio, Radio RS) together with internet radio network operated by BHRT with 6 thematic radio channels. In terms of ownership, 3 radio stations are non-profit organizations, 9 radio stations in total are funded through subscription (Television licence) while 70 stations are local, municipal or regional public broadcasters which competes with 111 commercial broadcasters in BiH.

The following is a list of radio stations in Bosnia and Herzegovina.

National and near-national coverage

Broadcasters funded by Television Tax
 BH Radio 1 - national public mainstream radio channel operated by BHRT from Sarajevo.
 ART Radio - Internet radio operated by MP BHRT
 DANCE Radio - Internet radio operated by MP BHRT
 EVERGREEN Radio - Internet radio operated by MP BHRT
 JAZZ.BA Radio - Internet radio operated by MP BHRT
 NAŠ Radio - Internet radio operated by MP BHRT
 SEVDAH Radio - Internet radio operated by MP BHRT
 Federalni Radio - entity level public radio channel operated by RTVFBiH from Sarajevo.
 Radio Republike Srpske - entity level public radio channel operated by RTRS from Banja Luka.

Commercial broadcasters
 Bobar Radio  - Bijeljina
 Radiopostaja "Mir" Međugorje - Međugorje (Religious broadcasting, Christian radio)
 Radio BN - Bijeljina operated by RTV BN
 RSG Radio - Sarajevo operated by RSG Media Group
 Radio Kalman - Sarajevo
 Nes radio - Banja Luka operated by Nezavisne novine
 Radio BIR - Sarajevo (Religious broadcasting, Islamic radio)
 Radio M - Sarajevo/Vogošća
 Big Radio 2 - Banja Luka operated by Big Radio
 Radio Mix - Sarajevo operated by RSG Media Group
 ORV Radio - Bijela, Brčko operated by OTV Valentino

Public broadcasters
 Radio Herceg-Bosne - Mostar operated by RTVHB

Nonprofit broadcasters
 Radio Otvorena mreža - Sarajevo
 Radio Marija BiH - Sarajevo (Religious broadcasting, Christian radio)

Local and regional coverage

Public broadcasters

 Radio Banovići - Banovići (also on AM frequency)
 Radio Bihać - Bihać
 Radio Bileća - Bileća                   
 Radio Bosanska Krupa - Bosanska Krupa
 Radio Bosanski Petrovac - Bosanski Petrovac
 Radio Brčko - Brčko
 Radio Brod - Brod/Bosanski Brod 
 Radio Bugojno - Bugojno operated by RTV Bugojno
 Radio Busovača - Busovača
 Radio Cazin - Cazin operated by RTV Cazin
 Radiopostaja Čapljina - Čapljina
 Radio Doboj - Doboj operated by RTV Doboj             
 Radio Donji Vakuf - Donji Vakuf
 Radio Drvar - Drvar
 Dub Radio - Bosanska Dubica/Kozarska Dubica operated by RTV Kozarska Dubica
 Radio Foča - Foča
 Radio Gacko - Gacko
 Radio Goražde - Goražde operated by RTV Goražde
 Radio Gračanica - Gračanica
 Radio Gradačac - Gradačac
 Radio Gradiška - Gradiška/Bosanska Gradiška            
 Radio gradska mreža - Mostarski radio - Mostar
 Mostarska panorama - Mostar
 Radio Ilijaš - Ilijaš
 Radio IS - Istočno Sarajevo operated by RTV IS
 Radio Jablanica - Jablanica operated by RTV Jablanica
 Radio Jajce - Jajce
 Radio Kiss FM - Mostar
 Radio Kladanj - Kladanj
 Radio Ključ - Ključ
 Radio Konjic - Konjic
 Radio Kostajnica - Kostajnica
 Radio Kupres - Kupres
 Radio Livno - Livno
 Radio Lukavac - Lukavac operated by TV Lukavac
 Radio Ljubuški - Ljubuški
 Radio Nevesinje - Nevesinje
 Radio Novi Grad - Bosanski Novi/Novi Grad
 Radio Olovo - Olovo     
 Radio postaja Odžak - Odžak
 Radio postaja Široki Brijeg - Široki Brijeg
 Radio Posušje - Posušje
 Radio Prača - Prača
 Radio Preporod - Odžak
 Radiopostaja Orašje - Orašje
 Radio Prijedor - Prijedor operated by TV Prijedor
 Radio Prnjavor - Prnjavor
 Radio Rama - Prozor
 Radio Sana - Sanski Most operated by RTV Sana
 Radio Srbac - Srbac
 Radio Srebrenik - Srebrenik
 Radio Tomislavgrad - Tomislavgrad
 Radio Trebinje - Trebinje
 Radio Tuzla - Tuzla operated by TV 7
 Radio Tuzlanskog kantona - Tuzla operated by RTV TK
 Radio TK - Studio Banovići - Banovići operated by Radio TK
 Radio TK - Studio Srebrenica - Srebrenica operated by Radio TK
 Radio USK - Bihać operated by RTV USK
 Radio Usora - Usora
 Radio Velika Kladuša - Velika Kladuša
 Radio Vlasenica - Vlasenica
 Radio Visoko - Visoko operated by TV Visoko
 Radio Višegrad - Višegrad
 Radio Vitez - Vitez 
 Radio Vogošća - Vogošća operated by TV Vogošća
 Radio Zenica - Zenica
 Radio Žepče - Žepče

Commercial broadcasters

 Radio A - Banja Luka operated by ATV
 Antena Radio Jelah - Tešanj
 Antena Sarajevo - Sarajevo operated by RSG Media Group
 Radio ASK - Ilidža
 Big Radio 1 - Banja Luka operated by Big Radio
 Big Radio 3 - Banja Luka operated by Big Radio
 Big Radio 4 - Banja Luka operated by Big Radio
 Bobar Radio - Studio B2 - Bijeljina operated by Bobar Radio
 Daš Extra Radio - Bijeljina operated by Daš Radio
 Daš Radio - Bijeljina
 DiV Radio - Prijedor
 Drukčiji Radio - Novi Travnik
 Free Radio Prijedor - Prijedor operated by DiV Radio
 Hard Rock Radio - Banja Luka 
 Hrvatski Radio Bobovac - Vareš
 K3 Radio Prnjavor - Prnjavor operated by TV K3
 Korona Radio 1 - Trebinje 
 Korona Radio 2 - Trebinje operated by Korona Radio
 Narodni radio Sarajevo - Sarajevo operated by TNT Grupacija
 Narodni radio Šipovo - Šipovo
 Narodni radio Tuzla - Tuzla operated by TNT Grupacija 
 Narodni radio Zenica - Zenica operated by TNT Grupacija
 Neovisni Radio Feral - Kalesija
 Novi Radio Bihać - Bihać
 Običan Radio - Mostar
 Pan Radio - Bijeljina
 Plavi FM - Banja Luka
 Pop FM - Banja Luka operated by Nezavisne novine
 PST radio - Kotor Varoš
 Radio 1503 Zavidovići - Zavidovići (also on AM frequency)
 Radio 303 - Rogatica
 Radio 8 - Sarajevo
 Radio Arena - Mostar 
 Radio Avaz - Čelić
 Radio BA - Sarajevo
 Radio Best Šipovo - Šipovo
 Radio Bet Fratello - Gradačac
 Radio Birač - Milići
 Radio Breza - Breza
 Radio Dobre Vibracije - Mostar
 Radio Džungla - Doboj   
 Radio Feniks - Bosanska Dubica/Kozarska Dubica
 Radio Glas Drine - Studio Onyx - Čelić operated by Radio Glas Drine
 Radio Glas Drine - Studio Sapna - Sapna operated by Radio Glas Drine
 Radio Glas Drine - Studio Srebrenica - Srebrenica operated by Radio Glas Drine
 Radio Grude - Grude	
 Radio HIT Brčko - Brčko operated by RTV HIT Brčko
 Radio Kakanj - Kakanj
 Radio Kameleon - Tuzla
 Radio Kontakt - Banja Luka operated by RTV Kontakt
 Radio Kozara - Gradiška/Bosanska Gradiška
 Radio Ljubić - Prnjavor
 Radio Magic - Milići
 Radio Maglaj - Maglaj operated by RTV Maglaj
 Radio Majevica - Lopare 
 Radio MANGO - Livno
 Radio Miljacka operated by Radio 8
 Radio Oscar C - Mostar operated by HTV Oscar C
 Radio OSM - Istočno Sarajevo
 Radio Osvit - Zvornik
 Radio Padrino - Trebinje
 Radio Plus - Posušje
 Radio S1 - Sarajevo operated by Radio S
 Radio Sarajevo - Sarajevo
 Radio Skala - Ugljevik
 Radio Slobomir - Bijeljina operated by RTV Slobomir
 Radio Slon - Tuzla operated by RTV Slon
 Radio Studio 99 - Sarajevo operated by Al Jazeera Balkans
 Radio Studio D - Srebrenik operated by Tatabrada TV
 Radio Studio M - Teslić
 Radio Tešanj - Tešanj
 Radio TNT Sarajevo - Travnik operated by TNT Grupacija
 Radio TNT Travnik - Travnik operated by TNT Grupacija
 Radio TNT Tuzla - Tuzla operated by TNT Grupacija
 Radio TNT Zenica - Travnik operated by TNT Grupacija
 Radio Vikom - Gradiška/Bosanska Gradiška
 Radio Velkaton - Velika Kladuša
 Radio UNO - Banja Luka
 Radio Zenit - Zenica
 Radio Zos - Tešanj
 RPŽ Radiopostaja Sarajevo - Sarajevo
 Studio 078 - Laktaši
 Šik Radio - Mrkonjić Grad
 Trend Radio - Velika Kladuša
 V.D. Vujke radio Šipovo - Šipovo

Nonprofit
 Radio Active - Zenica

Internet radio

 Moj radio  - Sarajevo operated by BH Telecom
 Radio USK 2  - Bihać operated by RTV USK
 Radio M Plus - Sarajevo operated by Radio M
 Imperia Radio  - Sarajevo operated by Imperia TV
 Big Folk Radio - Banja Luka (Big Radio)
 Big Balade Radio - Banja Luka operated by Big Radio
 Big Rock Radio - Banja Luka operated by Big Radio
 Studentski eFM Radio - Sarajevo 
 HP Radio - Sarajevo operated by Hayat TV
 Radio Nars] - Srebrenik
 Radio Džungla 2 - Doboj operated by Radio Džungla
 Radio Džungla 3 - Doboj operated by Radio Džungla 
 BBI Radio - Sarajevo operated by BBI Shopping center
 SCC Radio - Sarajevo operated by SCC Shopping center
 dress.FM - Sarajevo operated by New Yorker
 Šparkastični jukebox - Sarajevo operated by Sparkasse Bank BiH
 UniRadio - Sarajevo operated by UniCredit Bank

Defunct radio

 HR Radiopostaja Mostar
 Radio Ritam Sarajevo
 Radio Ritam Banja Luka
 Radio Ritam Mostar
 Radio Ritam Zenica
 Radio Ritam Visoko
 Radio Vrhbosna
 Radio BM
 Radio Istočno Sarajevo
 Radio Hayat
 Radio Zid
 Radio Aktivan
 Radio Agape
 Radio Studio N
 Radio Bulevar
 Plavi radio Banja Luka
 Oksigen FM
 Vikom Radio
 Radio Soli
 Radio Vesta
 Radio 88 Mostar
 Bordo radio-Glas Bosne Sarajevo
 Radio 202 Sarajevo
 Radiopostaja Novi Travnik
 Zavičajni radio Breške
 Radio FERN

Foreign radio services

List of foreign services/broadcaster that broadcast programs from or to Bosnia and Herzegovina audience:

 Radio Slobodna Evropa – daily news bulletins, morning and talk shows from Radio Free Europe/Radio Liberty broadcasts from Sarajevo via network of local Bosnian radio stations
 BFBS Radio 1 available in Sarajevo via FM, from Butmir Camp
 BFBS Radio 2 available in Sarajevo via FM, broadcasts from Butmir Camp
 BBC Minute – news bulletins from BBC World Service, available in English language on Antena Sarajevo
 Deutsche Welle/DW Radio – news and talk shows from DW-RADIO's Bosnian Service, also available on satellite or online as podcast in Bosnian language
 Vijesti Radija Vatikan – news and radio talk shows from Croatian services of Radio Vatican/Radio Vatikan broadcast from Vatican to listeners primarily in Croatia and Bosnia and Herzegovina via Radio Marija BiH
 IRIB - Bosanski radio program/IRIB World Service Bosnian – news and talk shows from IRIB World Service from Iran
 TRT Bosanski – news shows and talk programs from Voice of Turkey available online as podcasts or via satellite reception in Bosnian language
 Radio Television of Kosovo via Radio Kosovo 2 broadcasts daily and weekly news editions outputs in Bosnian language from Pristina
 Macedonian Radio Television broadcasts daily news programs in the Bosnian language via Radio Skopje 3
 Radio Forum - Das Südosteuropa-Magazin – daily radio news and talk show programs produced by Radio COSMO, German radio station intended for listeners in or from Southern Europe 
 SBS Bosanski on SBS Radio 1 - Programs in Bosnian language produced by SBS Radio from Australia
 CHIN Radio/TV International – Radio show programs in Bosnian language from Toronto, Canada
 TWR-Bosnian – radio shows podcasts produced online by Trans World Radio in Bosnian language
 Red Bull Radio Show - Weekly music radio show from Red Bull Radio on local Radio Sarajevo 90,2

Radio stations in Sarajevo

See also 
 Television in Bosnia and Herzegovina
 List of newspapers in Bosnia and Herzegovina

References

External links 
 www.bhrt.ba
 www.radio-uzivo.com (Bosna i Hercegovina)
 Communications Regulatory Agency of Bosnia and Herzegovina 

 
Bosnia and Herzegovina
Radio stations